The Parliament of Kurdistan ( or simply Perleman), also called the Kurdish Parliament (IKP), is the parliament of the Kurdistan Region of Iraq. It is made up of representatives from the various parties, lists or slates that are elected every four years by the inhabitants of the provinces of Kurdistan Region currently governed by the Kurdistan Regional Government. In 2009 an amendment was applied to the Kurdistan Election Law of the year 1992, and since then the body was referred to as Kurdish Parliament instead of its previous name the Kurdish National Assembly.

The IKP is a 111-member unicameral body in which 11 seats are reserved for non-Kurdish minority communities of the Kurdistan Region. The IKP building is located in Erbil, the capital of the Kurdistan Region.

The IKP holds two sessions per year, each covering a span of four months. The IKP works by committees that focus on certain areas, such as legal affairs, education and higher education, finance and economy, and culture. Legislative proposals and bills are initiated via the Regional Council of Ministries or by the endorsement of ten individual members of parliament.

Structure, functions, and founding principles
The parliament is the Kurdistan Region’s democratically elected legislative body, consisting of one elected chamber. The three main functions of the IKP are to examine proposals for new law, to scrutinise government policy and administration, and to debate the major issues of the day.

The founding principles of the IKP are liberty, pluralism, accountability, openness, and the representation of all peoples in the Kurdistan Region.

History of the Assembly
To protect civilians from attacks by Iraqi military forces following the 1991 Gulf War, the US, UK and France initiated a no-fly zone above the 36th line of latitude which cuts across Kurdistan. On the ground, a security zone was established by military forces from eleven countries. These no-fly and security zones strongly supported and encouraged refugees, including those who had left in the 1970s, to return to their homes.

Later in 1991, Saddam Hussein withdrew his forces and his administration, including the national flag, from parts of the Kurdistan Region. Compounding the hardship caused by an international UN embargo on Iraq, Saddam Hussein enforced an additional internal embargo on the region that stopped food and fuel supplies, disconnected electrical power and prevented the movement of people to other parts of the country.

Faced with the administrative vacuum and double embargo, the Kurdistan Front, an alliance of diverse political groups in Kurdistan Region, decided to hold a general election. Their goal was to establish an administration to provide for essential public services and to meet the basic needs of the people. The population also expressed a strong desire to choose its representatives. The election, held on 19 May 1992, was the first free and fair parliamentary election in the history of Iraq. Voter turnout was very high and the elections were deemed to be free, fair, and democratic by international observers. After decades of dictatorship, the people in Kurdistan were able to vote for their representatives.

This regional election led to the formation of the first Kurdistan National Assembly (later Kurdistan Region Parliament) and the establishment of the Kurdistan Regional Government. The leadership and the people of the Kurdistan Region decided to remain part of Iraq, and to adopt and abide by all national laws except for those that violated human and universal rights.

By 15 July 1992, the Kurdistan National Assembly had convened. Law No. 1, the first law passed by the assembly, established it as the Region’s legislature.

Elections

1992 elections
On 19 May 1992, 6 months after Kurds had gained their freedom, the first elections were held. Due to the 7% threshold the only parties which had a chance of winning seats in parliament were the KDP and the PUK. The election resulted in a narrow victory for the KDP, which with 45% of the vote gained 51 seats while the PUK with 44% of the vote gained 49 seats. However, due to allegations of election fraud they divided the seats 50–50 and created a unity government. The government however collapsed and resulted in a civil war breaking out in 1994. The last parliamentary meeting was held in 1996. It resulted in the creation of two Kurdish states, a PUK-controlled state based in Silemani and a KDP-controlled state based in Hewler, both proclaiming themselves as legitimate rulers of Kurdistan.

2005 elections

The primary goal of the 2005 elections was to end party-rule in the Kurdistan Region and unify the two major parties—the Kurdistan Democratic Party (KDP) and the Patriotic Union of Kurdistan (PUK)—who fought a civil war in the mid-1990s over territorial disputes and control of the Kurdistan Region. Previously, the region was divided up by administrative provinces that were under control of either the KDP or the PUK. In 2004, the two parties created one unified list or coalition called the Democratic Patriotic Alliance of Kurdistan, which included several smaller parties as well. Not surprisingly, the coalition received the majority of votes (an overwhelming 90%) allowing the KDP and PUK to effectively divide key positions in government. The coalition achieved 104 of the 111 seats in parliament.

In June 2012, the IKP held its first official meeting with Massoud Barzani as the elected president. After six long months, the IKP finally agreed on administration positions. In 2006, the government was selected with Nechervan Idris Barzani as prime minister. The parties also negotiated terms for the prime minister. Nechervan Barzani, who is a member of the KDP, was expected to serve two years and would be replaced with a PUK candidate in 2008.

Governorate elections were held in Iraq, in 2005, including in the three Kurdish provinces. The elections resulted in a KDP victory in Hewler and Dohuk with PUK a victory in Silemani. In total the PUK won the most votes in these 3 provinces together with a total of 765,544 votes (43.4%) however they won only 48 seats while the KDP with 741,483 votes (42%) won 62 seats. Other parties won only 4 seats in Kurdish provinces. Kurdish parties also won majorities in Nineveh and Kirkuk.

2009 elections

The latest parliamentary elections were held on 25 July 2009. Kurdistan List, a joint list of KDP and PUK, won the largest share of seats and was tasked to form the next government. Major opposition parties include Change List and Reform List with 25 and 13 seats respectively. The new prime minister, Barham Salih of PUK, assumed office on 28 October 2009. Minority Turkmen have five seats and Christians (Assyrians and Armenians) are represented with four seats. This KRG government comprised 19 ministries.

In 2005, Massoud Barzani was elected as President of Kurdistan Region by the parliament. In 2009, the KRG decided that the president would no longer be selected by parliament, and instead, direct elections would take place. In the 2009 elections, President Barzani ran for re-election and faced a host of opposing candidates including Halow Ibrahim Ahmed, Kamal Mirawdily, Ahmed Mohammed Rasul and Hussein Garmiyani. The election was a landslide victory for Barzani getting approximately 70% of the votes. Kemal Mirawdily came second with 25%.

Speakers of the National Assembly and the Parliament

Structure of the Kurdistan Parliament
There are 111 seats in the Kurdistan Parliament (as stipulated in Law No. 1 passed by the KNA in 1992). Currently, women hold 39 seats. The legal requirement is that at least 30% of the parliamentarians are women (according to IKP Law No. 1, Article 22 amended in Article 10 of Law no. 47 for 2004, third amendment of Law no. 1 for 1992).

Eleven seats have been allocated to represent the Assyrian, Armenian, and Turkmen minority communities in the KRG-administered provinces.

Powers of the Kurdistan National Assembly
As provided in the federal constitution of Iraq, the KNA has considerable power to debate and legislate on policy in a wide range of areas. It has a number of committees which work on the following areas:
 Agriculture and Irrigation
 Communication and Municipalities
 Culture
 Finance and Economic Affairs
 General and Higher Education
 Health and Social Affairs
 Home Affairs
 Housing and Reconstruction
 Human Rights
 Industry, Energy, and minerals
 Kurdistan Constitution
 Legal Affairs
 Peshmerga
 Ministry of Endowments and Religious Affairs
 Transport
 Women's rights

The KNA shares legislative power with the federal authorities in these areas, but priority is given to the KNA’s laws. In addition, under Article 121 of the Iraqi federal constitution, the KNA has the right to amend the application of Iraq-wide legislation that falls outside of the federal authorities’ exclusive powers.

Landmark legislation passed by the Kurdistan National Assembly

The KNA has passed several laws that have contributed to the Region’s social and economic progress. These include: passing a modern and open investment law; ¬ significantly increasing the prison sentence for those committing so-called honour killings, which were previously given minimum sentences. Other legislation and issues that the KNA is considering are: a petroleum law for the Kurdistan Region, which has been drafted and is being debated; ¬ a constitution for the Kurdistan Region; the KNA has established a committee to look into this and produce a draft; ¬ limits to or a ban on the practice of polygamy. Members of the Kurdistan National Assembly
In the current parliament elected on 30 January 2005, one member is independent and the others represent 14 different political parties, including Turkmen, Assyrian parties. Three members of the KNA are Yezidis belonging to different political parties.
[1] The formula for the allocation of seats is based on a first calculation using a simple quota (Hare quota), and subsequent calculations using the largest remainders.
[2] These powers are granted in the federal constitution of Iraq, articles 114, 115, 117, 120, 121, 126 and 141.
Members of the Kurdistan National Assembly
Independent Electoral Commission of Iraq Regulation 14/2005 on the KNA elections

Historical composition

See also
 Koma Civakên Kurdistan
 Kurdish Supreme Committee
 Kurdish National Council

References

External links
 Kurdistan Parliament official website

Politics of Kurdistan Region (Iraq)
Parliaments by country
1992 establishments in Iraq
Government agencies established in 1992